David Peter Battaglia (January 21, 1931 – February 1, 2017) was an American educator and politician.

Born in Buhl, Minnesota, Battaglia went to Martin Hughes High School in Buhl, Minnesota. He received his associate degree from Mesabi Range College, in Virginia, Minnesota. Battaglia received his bachelor's degree from St. Cloud State University in industrial arts education and social studies. He also went to graduate school at University of Minnesota Duluth. Battaglia moved Two Harbors, Minnesota in 1953 and was an industrial arts teacher. Battaglia served on the Two Harbors City Council and as mayor of Two Harbors, Minnesota. Battaglia was a Democrat. From 1977 to 1995, Battaglia served in the Minnesota House of Representatives. Battaglia died at a hospital in Duluth, Minnesota.

References

1931 births
2017 deaths
People from St. Louis County, Minnesota
People from Two Harbors, Minnesota
St. Cloud State University alumni
University of Minnesota Duluth alumni
Educators from Minnesota
Minnesota city council members
Mayors of places in Minnesota
Democratic Party members of the Minnesota House of Representatives